Sasha Filipenko is a Belarusian writer, journalist, and TV show host. His books were translated into more than 15 languages. His play The Ex-son was banned in Belarus and premiered in Kyiv, Ukraine, instead. In 2021 PEN International declared Filipenko a victim of censorship. He currently lives in Europe with his wife and son, since it is dangerous for him to come back to Belarus. For openly opposing Alexander Lukashenko and supporting Maria Kalesnikava Filipenko can be prosecuted - official press (Sovetskaya Belorussiya – Belarus' Segodnya) mentions quotes of the Criminal Code (articles up to 12 years in prison) that can be applied to Filipenko.

Biography 
Filipenko was born in Minsk into a mixed Russian-Ukrainian family, studied in an arts lyceum, and got his BSc (2007) and MSc (2009) in literature in Saint-Petersburg University. Filipenko worked at the Russian independent TV channel Dozhd.

Filipenko's books are staged in a number of theatres including Russia's leading avant-garde theatre Gogol Center and classical Alexandrinsky Theatre. His books became best-sellers in Germany and the Netherlands, were recommended by Oprah book blog. During the 2022 Russian invasion of Ukraine British daily newspaper The Guardian published his widely discussed article regarding the background of the ongoing war and the Belarus, Russia and Ukraine "dysfunctional family affair".

Political activism 

During the 2020–2021 Belarusian protests, Filipenko wrote a number of articles harshly criticizing the Lukashenko regime and calling for political prisoners release in Belarusian Russian, German, British, Swedish, Dutch, Polish, and French press. In 2021 he wrote an open letter to the president of International Ice Hockey Federation René Fasel against holding an International Hockey Championship in Belarus, that was published by several European newspapers, including German Frankfurter Allgemeine Zeitung and Süddeutsche Zeitung, Swedish Aftonbladet, and Polish Gazeta Wyborcza.

Filipenko wrote an open letter to International Committee of the Red Cross's president because the organisation refused to inspect Belarusian prisons, where political prisoners were tortured after the protests.

In 2022 he spoke at the Munich Security Conference together with Belarusian opposition leader Sviatlana Tsikhanouskaya.

Bibliography 
 2013 - "Птицы лёгкого поведения" ("Птушкі лёгкіх паводзінаў")
 2014 - Бывший сын ( French edition)
 2015 - Замыслы 
 2015 - "Петю укусила собака" for the antology "Стоп-кадр. Ностальгия"
 2016 - Травля 
 2017 - Красный крест ( English edition) ( French edition)
 2019 - Возвращение в Острог
 2020 - "Новая волна" (literary edition of the Esquire)
 2022 - Кремулятор

Awards 
 2011: Diplome of the Belarusian PEN club
 2014: Znamya magazine award
 2016: Big Book Award - shortlist
 2016: Snob award: Made in Russia
 2020: Yasnaya Polyana Literary Award - Reader's Choice

References

External links 

Belarusian writers
Belarusian journalists
1984 births
Living people
Belarusian people of Russian descent
Belarusian people of Ukrainian descent